This is a list of monuments that are classified by the Moroccan ministry of culture around Chefchaouen.

Monuments and sites in Chefchaouen 

|}

References 

Chefchaouen
Chefchaouen